The Root of Evil: The True Story of the Hodel Family and the Black Dahlia or simply, Root of Evil, is an American investigative crime podcast covering the Black Dahlia murder and suspect George Hodel. The podcast was produced as a partnership between Cadence13 and TNT as a companion to the fictional television series I Am the Night. The podcast is hosted by Yvette Gentile and Rasha Pecoraro, George Hodel's great-granddaughters. It features interviews with those who were impacted by the murder, including Hodel's relatives. The podcast charted in the United States, United Kingdom, Australia, and Canada, reaching the number one spot in the United States on April 21, 2019.

Background

In 1947, Elizabeth Short, known as the Black Dahlia, was brutally murdered. The murder remains unsolved; however, George Hodel, a surgeon, was one of the primary suspects. After George Hodel's death in 1999, his son, Steve Hodel, a former homicide detective with the Los Angeles County Police Department, desired to learn more about his father and discovered information leading him to believe that George Hodel was the killer of the Black Dahlia.

The podcast is hosted by Hodel's great-granddaughters, Yvette Gentile and Rasha Pecoraro, the daughters of Fauna Hodel. Throughout the podcast, the sisters interview their relatives, discuss 70 years of family history, and reveal the ways the family changed after the Black Dahlia case. After her death in September 2017, Fauna Hodel's daughters began to sort through the things she left behind. In the podcast, Gentile and Pecoraro analyze audio recordings between Fauna and her mother, Tamar, George's daughter. Gentile and Pecoraro also reflect upon the weight that the Hodel name carries. This is the first time that the family members have publicly spoken about their past. Gentile and Pecoraro believe that their great-grandfather did kill Elizabeth Short.

Episodes

Awards and nominations
The podcast was nominated for "Best Crime Podcast" at the 2020 iHeartRadio Podcast Awards, but lost the award to Man in the Window.

See also
List of American crime podcasts
 George Hodel
 I Am the Night, a 2019 TNT Drama TV miniseries, featuring Jefferson Mays as George Hodel

References

Crime podcasts
2019 podcast debuts
2019 podcast endings
Audio podcasts